The Tri Valley Titans were an International Basketball League franchise based in Livermore, California. The Titans represented the Tri-Valley area of California, an area that also includes Danville, Dublin, San Ramon and Pleasanton, California. The team normally played its home games at Las Positas College, in Livermore. The IBL is a spring league, playing a March through June regular season.

History 
The Tri Valley Titans were introduced by the International Basketball League on August 10, 2006.

2005 Season

The team nickname in 2005 and 2006 was the Ballers.  The team played its first season in San Jose, California at San Jose City College. The team boasted the IBL's two top scorers in Jovan Harris (35.3 ppg), and Alejandro Thomas (28.3 ppg), but finished a disappointing 10-10.

2006 season
As the newly relocated Tri City Ballers, playing in Newark, California, the franchise displayed much better results, finishing 14-4, and pacing the west. All-Star Jovan Harris once again led the team in scoring, but this time with just 24.6 ppg. The team also featured all-star Rock Winston (21.0 ppg).

2007 season
The nomadic franchise again was on the move to Livermore, California for 2007, this time taking on the name, Tri Valley Titans. The team compiled a record of 10-4 as a member of the Southwest Division, but three of its scheduled regular season games were apparently not played.  The IBL deactivated the team at the end of the regular season.

Standings

References

External links
- 2007 team page on IBL website
- 2006 team page on IBL website
- Team 2007 game scores
- IBL 2007 game scores
- 2007 Team roster

International Basketball League teams
Defunct basketball teams in California
Livermore, California
2005 establishments in California